The Eagle: A Crime Odyssey (In Danish: "Ørnen: En krimi-odyssé") (2004-2006) is a Danish police procedural television series produced by Danmarks Radio, created and written by Peter Thorsboe and Mai Brostrøm. The series debuted on 10 October 2004 in Denmark. It won an International Emmy Award from the International Academy of Television Arts & Sciences for best non-American television drama series in 2005. There were three seasons; the second season premiered in Denmark on 9 October 2005 and the third on 8 October 2006. The last episode originally aired in Denmark on 26 November 2006. The series was filmed on location in various parts of northern Europe, from Berlin (Germany) and Copenhagen (Denmark) to Stockholm (Sweden), Oslo (Norway) and Iceland.

Plot
The series is named after the lead character, a half-Icelandic half-Danish police officer named Hallgrim Ørn Hallgrimsson, nicknamed "Ørnen" (the eagle). In the first episode, a new international criminal investigative unit is being formed under Thea Nellemann (Ghita Nørby), and Hallgrimsson (Jens Albinus) is persuaded to take the job as the lead investigator for the unit. He puts together a small investigation team that are experts in their respective fields. Their cases cross the borders between Denmark, Norway, Sweden, Germany, Russia and various other countries; and involve biker gangs, former Russian KGB, possible terrorist threats and international fraud. Throughout the series Hallgrimsson deals with recurring flashbacks and possibly post-traumatic stress from a childhood incident.

Cast

Main Characters
 Jens Albinus as Hallgrim Ørn Hallgrimsson (2004–2006)
 Marina Bouras as Marie Wied (2004–2006)
 Steen Stig Lommer as 	Villy Frandsen (2004–2006)
 Susan A. Olsen as Ditte Hansen (2004–2006)
 Janus Nabil Bakrawi as Nazim Talawi (2004–2006)
 David Owe as Michael Kristensen (2004–2006)
 Ghita Nørby as Thea Nellemann (2004–2006)
 Hans Alfredsson as Hallgrim's dad (2004-2006)

Recurring Characters
 Henrik Lykkegaard as Jens Hansen (2004–2006)
 Morten Lützhøft as Holsøe (2004–2006)
 Kristian Wanzl as Gustav (2005)

Episodes
The episodes bear the names of the following entities from Greek mythology:
Sisyphus, Scylla, Iphigenia, Ares, Nemesis, Hades, Cronus, Erinyes, Agamemnon, Keres, Calypso, Thanatos, Minos and Ithaca.

Season 1

Season 2

Season 3

Title track 
The title track is called "Forgiveness".  It is composed by Jacob Groth with lyrics and vocals by his spouse Misen Groth.

External links 
 Lyrics to the theme song.
 Jacob Groth's official site.  Various snippets can be downloaded.
 .

2004 Danish television series debuts
2006 Danish television series endings
2000s Danish television series
2000s crime drama television series
2000s police procedural television series
DR television dramas
Danish crime television series
Danish drama television series
International Emmy Award for Best Drama Series winners